Jefferson Township is one of twelve townships in Dubois County, Indiana. As of the 2010 census, its population was 1,543 and it contained 683 housing units.

History
Jefferson Township was created from land given by Hall Township.

Geography

Cities and towns
 Birdseye

Unincorporated towns
 Mentor
 Schnellville

Adjacent townships
 Hall Township (north)
 Patoka Township, Crawford County (northeast)
 Johnson Township, Crawford County (east)
 Clark Township, Perry County (south)
 Ferdinand Township (southwest)
 Jackson Township (west)

Major highways
  Indiana State Road 64
  Indiana State Road 145

Cemeteries
The township contains five cemeteries: Cox, Garland, Spencer, Taylor and Waddle.

References
 
 United States Census Bureau cartographic boundary files

External links
 Indiana Township Association
 United Township Association of Indiana

Townships in Dubois County, Indiana
Jasper, Indiana micropolitan area
Townships in Indiana